(The) White Raven may refer to:

Animals
Raven, a bird that is usually black, very rarely white

Books
 The White Raven (novel), a 2009 novel by Robert Low
 The White Raven, a 1995 novel by Michael Blodgett
 Biały Kruk, translated as White Raven in English, a 1995 novel by Andrzej Stasiuk

Films
 The White Raven (1917 film), an existing silent film drama.
 The White Raven (1998 film), an action crime thriller based on the Michael Blodgett novel
 White Raven (2015 film), a Canadian horror film

Other uses
 White Raven (opera), a 1998 opera by Philip Glass
 White Raven, the second life of Raven, a fictional superheroine of DC Comics
 White raven, animals in the book series The Edge Chronicles by Paul Stewart and Chris Riddell
 White Ravens, awards organized by the International Youth Library
 A metaphor for any rare or completely non-existent object, from the raven paradox